Chandan may refer to: 
 Chandan, is a surname used by Hindus in India
 Chandana, the Sanskrit name for Indian sandalwood (Santalum album)
 Chandan (film), a 1958 film
 Chandan Yatra, an Indian festival

Given name
 Chandan, son of Panna Dai, 16th century nursemaid who let him be murdered to save the life of the heir to the throne of Mewar
 Chandan Brahma, Indian politician
 Chandan Dass, Indian singer
 Chandan Kumar, Indian actor
 Chandan Prabhakar, Indian comedian
 Chandan Shetty, Indian composer
 Chandan Dass, Indian tool maker